Sniff 'n' the Tears is a British rock band best known for their 1978 song "Driver's Seat", a moderate hit in many countries (including No. 15 on the American Billboard Hot 100) (in September 1979). The band is led by singer/songwriter Paul Roberts, the band's sole constant member.

Formation and initial success (1973–1979) 
An early version of Sniff 'n' The Tears had been gigging in England as early as 1974.  They were unable to land a record deal and the band's singer/songwriter Paul Roberts decided to dissolve the group and move to France.

A few years later, Luigi Salvoni, the drummer from a band called Moon, listened to some demos that he and Roberts had cut in about 1975 for a French record label. Hearing some potential in them, he contacted Roberts about approaching Chiswick Records for a deal. Sniff 'n' The Tears subsequently debuted in 1977 as a six-piece band, consisting of Paul Roberts (vocals, acoustic guitar), Loz Netto (guitars), Mick Dyche (guitars), Chris Birkin (bass), Alan Fealdman (keyboards), and Luigi Salvoni (drums & percussion). Both Salvoni and Netto had been in the band Moon, which issued two albums in the UK in 1975/76.

This line-up recorded the band's first album, Fickle Heart, which was produced by Salvoni. Guesting on the album as a backing vocalist was Noel McCalla, who had been Moon's lead singer.

Though recorded in 1978, the album sat unreleased for over a year because Chiswick were in the process of changing their distribution. The band then had a substantial international hit with Fickle Hearts lead single "Driver's Seat" in 1979, aided by its driving rhythm, catchy lyrics and a Moog solo contributed by guest musician Keith Miller. However, the band fractured almost immediately after the album's release; in a matter of months, Birkin, Fealdman, and Salvoni all left the group to pursue other interests.

Nick South took over on bass and would become a permanent member of the band. On tour, Sniff 'n' The Tears were augmented by drummer Paul Robinson and keyboardist Mike Taylor.

When naming the band, Roberts suggested "The Tears", but their manager suggested  "Sniff 'n' the Tears" because Roberts had hay fever and sniffed a lot.

The 1980s 
For the group's second album, 1980's The Game's Up, the band line-up consisted of Roberts, Netto, Dyche, South, and new keyboard player Mike Taylor.  At this point the group had no permanent drummer, and a variety of session drummers were used.

The Game's Up yielded no hits, and Netto left the group to establish a solo career, taking Dyche with him. This left Roberts as the sole remaining original member of Sniff 'n' The Tears.  He decided to press on, and recruited Les Davidson as the group's new guitarist and added Jamie Lane as the permanent drummer.  This five piece line-up (Roberts, Davidson, Lane, South and Taylor) recorded two albums: Love/Action (1981), and Ride Blue Divide (1982).  Again no hits were spun off from these albums, and after having been dropped by Chiswick Records, the group broke up in 1983.

Singer and songwriter Paul Roberts went on to make two solo albums for Sonet Records: City Without Walls (1985) and Kettle Drum Blues (1987), while Loz Netto issued singles like "Fade Away" and "We Touch" (the latter song turning up in an episode of the Miami Vice television show).

Reformation (1992–present) 
After a decade of inactivity, Sniff 'n' The Tears were unexpectedly revived in 1992, after the use of "Driver's Seat" in a European advertising campaign pushed the 13-year-old recording to the very top of the Dutch chart in mid-1991.  Roberts took the opportunity to assemble a new version of Sniff 'n' the Tears, and took them out on the road in the Netherlands and Germany. This version of the band consisted of Roberts and Davidson, with new recruits Jeremy Meek (bass) (Ex Live Wire), Steve Jackson (drums) and Andy Giddings (keyboards).  This line-up also cut a new studio album in 1992, No Damage Done, which was the first new Sniff 'n' the Tears release in a decade.

"Driver's Seat" was prominently featured on the soundtrack of the 1997 film Boogie Nights and had another popular resurgence as a result, although most radio outlets played the 1991 re-release version instead of the original. The song also appeared in The Walking Dead Season 2 Episode 10 "18 Miles Out".

The band's next release, 2001's Underground, featured Roberts singing and playing almost everything.  He was credited with vocals, guitars, mandolin, harmonica, keyboards, bass and drum programming.  However, longtime group member Les Davidson also played guitar on the album, and new member Robin Langridge handled the bulk of keyboard parts.

After another long hiatus, the band released their seventh album, Downstream, in February 2011.  The Sniff 'n' the Tears line-up for this album consisted of Paul Roberts (vocals, guitars, bass, keyboard), Les Davidson (guitars), Robin Langridge (keyboards), returning member Nick South (bass). and new member Richard Marcangelo (drums).  Marcangelo had previously been a session player on The Game's Up. Jennifer Maidman, who had played bass on Paul Roberts' two solo albums, also played bass on several tracks.

A line-up of Roberts, Davidson, South, Langridge and new drummer Paul Robinson issued the album Random Elements in 2017.  While Roberts remained the band's primary songwriter, for this album Davidson and Langridge also received co-writing credits on a number of tracks.  Robinson, meanwhile, had toured with the group as their drummer in the late 1970s; this marked his official entry into the group 37 years later.

In 2020, Sniff 'n' The Tears (now consisting only of Roberts and Davidson) issued the album Jump, which consisted of new acoustic versions of a number of songs in the band's catalogue (including "Driver's Seat".)

Discography

Studio albums

Compilations

Singles

Musicians 
Paul Roberts (vocals, acoustic guitar) (in 2001 played bass guitar, mandolin and additional keyboards) 1978–present
Les Davidson (guitars, background vocals) 1981–1992, 2001–present
Loz Netto (guitars) 1978–81
Chris Birkin (bass) 1978–79
Mick Dyche (guitars) 1978–81
Rick Fenn (guitars) 1980–81
Nick South (bass) 1980–81, 2011–present
Jeremy Meek (bass) 1992
Jennifer Maidman (bass) 2011
Luigi Salvoni (drums) 1978, rejoined the band briefly in 1992
Paul Robinson (drums) 1979, 2017–present
Jamie Lane (drums) 1981–82
Steve Jackson (drums) 1992
Richard Marcangelo (drums) 2011–2017
Alan Fealdman (keyboards) 1978
Keith Miller (synthesizer) 1978
Mike Taylor (keyboards) 1980–81
Andy Giddings (keyboards) 1992
Robin Langridge (keyboards) 2001–present
Noel McCalla (backing vocals) 1978–80

Timeline

See also 
List of 1970s one-hit wonders in the United States

References

External links 

 

English rock music groups
English new wave musical groups
British soft rock music groups
Musical groups established in 1977
Provogue Records artists
Second British Invasion artists